Florence Haring (born 2 October 1985) is a French professional tennis player.

Haring has won one doubles on the ITF tour in her career. On 26 June 2006 she reached her best singles ranking of world number 213. On 19 October 2009, she peaked at world number 255 in the doubles rankings.

Career
Haring competed in the main draw of the French Open in doubles in 2005, 2006, and 2007. She and her partner lost each time in the first round.

Career statistics

Singles finals: 6 (0–6)

Doubles finals: 6 (1–5)

External links
 
 

1985 births
Living people
French female tennis players
Sportspeople from Ain
Tennis players from Geneva